Echinopsis bridgesii,  is a species of Echinopsis found in Bolivia.

Description 
This species often grows in groups and forms three to six shoots from the base. The spherical to elongated shoots reach heights of up to 40 cm with a diameter of 13 cm. There are nine to twelve distinct ribs that are notched or notched. The large areoles on it are brown. From them spring short and conical or longer and needle-like thorns of up to 2 centimeters in length. The mostly single central spine, sometimes it is missing or several are formed, is tipped gray and darker. The 8-10 very uneven marginal spines are brown.

The white flowers open at night. They are 15 to 20 centimeters long.

Distribution
Echinopsis bridgesii is commonly found in the department of La Paz, Bolivia growing in dry valleys and the puna grassland at elevations of 2900 to 3200 meters.

The first description by Joseph zu Salm-Reifferscheidt-Dyck was published in 1850

Subspecies
A distinction is made between the following subspecies:

References

External links
 
 

bridgesii